Belonophora is a genus of flowering plants in the family Rubiaceae. It is found in Tropical Africa from Senegal east to Sudan and south to Angola. It was described by Joseph Dalton Hooker in 1873.

Species
Belonophora coffeoides Hook.f.
Belonophora coffeoides subsp. coffeoides - São Tomé (not seen since 1861, possibly extinct)
Belonophora coffeoides subsp. hypoglauca (Welw. ex Hiern) S.E.Dawson & Cheek - Benin, Ghana, Guinée, Cote d'Ivoire, Liberia, Nigeria, Sierra Leone, Togo, Central African Republic, Cameroon, Gabon, Congo-Brazzaville, D.R.Congo, Chad, Sudan, Uganda, Angola, Zambia 
Belonophora coriacea Hoyle - Nigeria, Central African Republic, Cameroon, Equatorial Guinea, Congo-Brazzaville, D.R.Congo 
Belonophora ongensis S.E.Dawson & Cheek - Cameroon, Gabon
Belonophora talbotii (Wernham) Keay - Nigeria, Cameroon, Gabon
Belonophora wernhamii Hutch. & Dalziel  - Nigeria, Cameroon

References

 
Rubiaceae genera
Flora of Africa
Taxonomy articles created by Polbot
Taxa named by Joseph Dalton Hooker